Morgan Griffin (born 4 June 1992) is an Australian actress. Her career began in the children's series The Sleepover Club playing the lead role of Charlie. Other notable roles include Heidi in September (2007), Alice in Nim's Island (2008), Katrina Post in Accidents Happen (2009) opposite Geena Davis and Jess in Charlie & Boots (2009) opposite Paul Hogan and Shane Jacobson. Griffin went on to perform alongside David Duchovny and Hope Davis as their daughter in Anthony Fabian's film Louder Than Words. She appeared in Angelina Jolie's film Unbroken, and in 2015, Griffin appeared in director Brad Peyton's disaster film San Andreas opposite Dwayne Johnson. In 2017 she was awarded a place in the top ten finalists for Australians in Film's Heath Ledger Scholarship. In 2018, Griffin portrayed Young Olivia Newton-John in Olivia Newton-John: Hopelessly Devoted to You. In 2020, she starred in the Australian independent film Reaching Distance and as Tiff Adams in the Australian series Amazing Grace.

Filmography

Film

TV series

References

External links 

 
 
 Morgan Griffin at Instagram

1992 births
21st-century Australian actresses
Australian film actresses
Australian television actresses
Living people
21st-century Irish actresses